Dražeta, in some English sources also Drazeta, is a fairly rare South Slavic surname and archaic personal name, originally found in five places on the territory of former Yugoslavia: Mošorin (Serbia), Stari Banovci (Serbia), Ivoševci (Croatia), Hodilje (Croatia), and Jajce (Bosnia and Herzegovina). People with this surname who live in Mošorin, Stari Banovci, and Ivoševci are Orthodox Serbs, while those who live in Hodilje and Jajce are Catholic Croats . The family slava (patron saint) of Orthodox Dražeta is Saint Stephen. There is information claiming that some Muslim Bosniaks with this surname live in western Bosnia near Prijedor, but this is not confirmed.

Origin

Surname Dražeta derived from the South Slavic first name Dražeta, which was first recorded in the 12th century in Herzegovina. First name Dražeta derived from its older variant Draže, which derived from Slavic word "drag" ("dear" in English). It is not exactly clear where and when the surname Dražeta appeared since first reliable data about surname dating from the 18th century. There is also a record from 1521 about a person in the village of Desići in Montenegro, whose name was Dražeta Radivoj, but it is not certain whether Dražeta was the name or surname of this person.

Surname history

Surname Dražeta was recorded in Mošorin in 1783 and in Stari Banovci in 1805. Dražeta families living in these two villages considered each other a cousins and in the past they often visited each other during family celebrations. According to the "Hronika Starih Banovaca" (Sremska Mitrovica, 1989), Dražeta family came to Stari Banovci from Croatia. In Mošorin, in the year 1783, documents recorded Marko Dražeta, who was a son of Grigorije "šijak". In that time, "šijak" was a designation for immigrants from Croatia. Since surname Dražeta could be found in the village Ivoševci in Croatia (north Dalmatia), it is assumed that Dražeta family moved from this village to Mošorin and Stari Banovci. Confirmation for this origin is the same patron saint of the family (Saint Stephen) that is celebrated by Dražeta families in all three villages. There is also an interesting quotation from Dušan J. Popović in his book Srbi u Vojvodini (volume 2, Novi Sad, 1990) that in the villages of Mošorin and Vilovo lived especially many "šijaks" originating from Dalmatia and Croatia.

In search for origin of Dražeta family in the village of Ivoševci, it is important to mention cousin relations between this family and family Vujasinović, i.e. Dražeta and Vujasinović families that live in Ivoševci consider each other a cousins and there are two different stories about relations between these two families: according to one story, Vujasinović was a former surname of the Dražeta family, while Dražeta was a nickname of this family that later became distinct surname. Confirmation for this could be the fact that both families, Dražeta and Vujasinović, celebrating the same patron saint of the family (Saint Stephen) because there was old practice among Serbs that families could change a surname, but not patron saint.

According to another story, Vujasinović was not a former surname of the Dražeta family, but both families, Dražeta and Vujasinović, came to Ivoševci from village Lužci near Sanski Most in western Bosnia, and cousin relations between these two families derived from the fact that wife of the ancestor of Vujasinović family was from the Dražeta family. According to stories that were not confirmed, there was surname Dražeta in western Bosnia near Prijedor, and this Dražeta family was of Muslim faith, which could confirm the story that Dražeta family from Ivoševci originating from this area. In the book "Prezimena Srba u Bosni" (Đorđe Janjatović, Sombor, 1993) we found data that near Prijedor and Sanski Most there are families with surnames Vujasinović and Vujasin, and both families celebrating Saint Stephen as patron saint of the family. This confirm that Vujasinović family from Ivoševci originating from this area.

According to the book "Antroponimija Bukovice" (Živko Bjelanović, Split, 1988), population of eastern part of Dalmatian Bukovica (which include Ivoševci) moved to this area from western Bosnia in the end of the 17th century. This confirm that Dražeta family originating from western Bosnia, no matter of the question whether family had surname Dražeta or surname Vujasinović in the time when it settled in Ivoševci. According to the book "Prezimena Srba u Bosni", largest number of surnames among Serbs and Croats was created in the 16th and 17th century, and that is a time when ancestors of the Dražeta family probably lived in western Bosnia. Thus, this would be approximate time and place when and where surname Dražeta first appeared.

According to the "Antroponimija Bukovice", the population of west Bosnia, Lika and Dalmatia (i.e. the population that was settled in these areas in the 16th and 17th century) originating from Montenegro and Herzegovina, especially from the area between Piva, Tara, Lim, and upper Neretva. Exactly in the territory of Montenegro we found data that in 1521 in the village Desići there was a person with name Dražeta Radivoj, but we cannot say for sure whether Dražeta was a name or a surname of this person. Possible confirmation for Montenegrin origin of the Dražeta family could be also an uncorfimed story that surname Dražeta existed in Boka Kotorska in Montenegro. According to the story, this Dražeta family from Boka Kotorska was of Orthodox faith.

As for the origin of the Dražeta families of Catholic faith from Hodilje and Jajce, we cannot say for sure whether these two Dražeta families are related one to another or to other Dražeta families that are adherents of the Orthodox Christianity. According to the Dr. Nikola Zvonimir Bjelovučić ("Poluostrvo Rat (Pelješac)", Naselja i poreklo stanovništva, knjiga 11, Beograd, 1922), Dražeta family from Hodilje settled in this village "100 years ago" (i.e. c. 1822) and they came "from unknown place". There are several different stories that speak about places from which this Dražeta family could came, and such places include Herzegovina, north Dalmatia, Vojvodina, Croatian Zagorje, etc. There are also stories that ancestors of the Dražeta family from Hodilje were in the past either Orthodox Christians or Muslims. This story certainly have a similarity with the story that Dražeta family of Muslim faith lived in western Bosnia. There is also story that old surname of the Dražeta family from Hodilje was either Delo or Ruda. As for the Dražeta family from Jajce, it is not known from where this family originating and when exactly they settled in Jajce; according to one story they originating from south Dalmatia (Hodilje), while according to another story, they originating from Vojvodina. The story that this family originating from south Dalmatia could be more accurate because Dražeta family that live in south Dalmatia is also of Catholic faith like Dražeta family from Jajce, while Dražeta families that live in Vojvodina are of Orthodox faith.

Similar names and surnames

The existence of the personal name Dražeta was confirmed in the historical documents from the 12th century, while the existence of the personal name or surname Dražetin, which derived from name Dražeta, was confirmed in the historical document from the 14th century. Today, personal name Dražeta is still used, but rarely: according to the telephone directory of Croatia from 2004, there was a person with name Dražeta Davidović that lived in Knin, while a person with name Dražeta Dražetić was author of an article in the Croatian magazine "Mljekarstvo" (number 03, from 2003).

According to the registry books in the village Mošorin, surname Dražeta is found in the records in four different variants: Dražeta (Дражета), Dražetin (Дражетин), Dražetić (Дражетић), and Dražetič (Дражетич), but there is no doubt that Dražeta was the original variant of the surname. Today, among Dražeta family from Mošorin, only two variants of the surname (Dražeta and Dražetin) are still in use, while another two (Dražetić and Dražetič) are no longer used.

Surname Dražetić also exist in the villages Turbe and Imljani in central Bosnia, as well as in the several places in Croatia, mostly near Petrinja, Slavonska Požega, Sisak, Velika Gorica, and Zagreb. This surname was first time in history recorded in Šibenik in 1386. In 1416, there is a record about prince Grgur Dražetić, who was a neighbour of the Ragusans and who ruled over part of Dalmatia that included Omiš. Surname Dražetić is also recorded in Velika Pisanica in Slavonia in 1783.

There is no doubt that surname Dražetić derived from root Dražeta, but we cannot say for sure whether this root was a name or a surname in this case. If surname Dražetić derived from surname Dražeta (which indeed happened among Dražeta family in Mošorin), we would have to raise a question of the possible cousin relations between families with surname Dražetić and families with surname Dražeta, especially those from Hodilje and Jajce because Dražeta families from these two places are of Catholic faith like most members of the families with surname Dražetić. There was also a record about Dražetić family of Orthodox faith in the village of Golubinjak near Daruvar in Slavonia.

Surname Dražetič that exist in Slovenia is probably only a variant of the surname Dražetić because Slovene alphabet do not use Serbo-Croatian letter "ć".

In 1882 in Sarajevo, there was a record about surname Dražetović (Дражетовић). Family with this surname was of Orthodox faith and patron saint of this family was Saint Sava. This surname did not derived from root Dražeta, but from the root Draže, which was also a root for name Dražeta.

In "Srpski Rječnik" (written by Vuk Stefanović Karadžić, Vienna, 1852), there is a record of the word "dražetina", which was used as augmentative of the word "draga" ("dear" in English).

Historical records about name Dražeta

Inscription from Čičevo
The oldest recorded data about the personal name Dražeta is found in a stone inscription in Saint Peter's church in Crnče, Donje Čičevo near Trebinje. It was made between 1177 and 1200 AD and says: "Poleta, Drusan (Družan) and Dražeta buried their mother in the days of glorious Duke Hramko (Hranko, Sranko)" ("Poleta, Drusan (Družan), Dražeta činu raku nad materiju (materom) u dani slavnoga kneza Hramka").

Bosnian Church supreme priest 
In the beginning of the 13th century, one of the religious leaders of the Bosnian Church had name Dražeta. There are two history sources that mention this person: Bilinopoljska izjava (the statement of Bilino Polje; Bilino Polje abjuration) and the list of djed of the Bosnian Church.

The abjuration of Bilino Polje is a document in which leaders of Bosnian Church (rarely but still sometimes alleged as Bogumils), in front of the emissary of the Pope Inocent III, declared that they abjure, that is deny their heresy. The statement was signed on April 8, 1203, in Bilino Polje near Zenica, and one of the Bosnian Church leaders that signed the document had name Dražeta. Names of other priors were: Dragič, Ljubin, Pribiš, Ljuben, Radoš and Vladoš. In this time, Dragič was the supreme priest ("djed"), while Ljubin and Dražeta were his deputies ("gosti"), but both of them will later become the supreme priests. After the statement was signed, Ljubin and Dražeta went to Hungarian king Emerik and, in front of him, they swore that they will fulfil decisions from the statement. However, this statement had only formal character since the Bosnian krstjani, as the members of the Bosnian Church were known and called themselves, despite the signed statement, continued to practice their faith.

Other source that speaks about krstjani leader named Dražeta is the List of djed of the Bosnian Church, which is found in the so-called Bible of Batal or Batal's Gospel from 1393, written for Bosnian nobleman Batal, who was tepačija at the Bosnian court. The list mention names of all supreme priests of Bosnian Church, from the middle of the 11th century to 1393. This list show that, after Dragič, the supreme priest of the Bosnian krstjani was Ljuben and after Ljuben it was Dražeta. Thus, Dražeta was the supreme priest ("djed") of the Bosnian Church. It is assumed that Dražeta administered Bosnian Church from 1215 to 1220.

Inscription on stećak
There is one inscription from 1258 written on stećak (Bosnian medieval tombstone), which mention stonecutter who had name Dražeta. The tombstone was found in Gornje Hrasno between Neum and Stolac, in Bosnia and Herzegovina.

This is the inscription:
"A se leži Ljubljen u Vrhbosni rožden u Vrhbosni zakopan na svojini na plemenitoj." ("Here lies Ljubljen, born and buried in Vrhbosna, on his noble property.")
"Ja bjeh onaj tkoji cijel život na raskrsnicam stajah, razmišljah, oklijevah." ("I was the one who stood on the crossroads during my whole life, the one who thought and the one who hesitated.")
"Bjeh onaj tkoji se pitah kak to da nebo ne stari a iz njeg se stalno raždaju nova i nova godišnja doba." ("I was the one who asked myself how it can be that sky does not grow old and new seasons are born from it over and over again.")
"I u sobi gde bjeh bješe prozor, a iza prozora beskraj. Al ja uporno gledah u pod." ("And in the room where I dwell there was a window, and behind the window there was the infinity, but I persistently watched the floor.")
"I mišljah mojom smerti sve će to konačno stati. Al nije i moja smert sve starša i sve tješnja je." ("And I thought, when I die, all of this will finally stop. But it didn't, and my death is too old and too close.")
"Kam mi usječe Dražeta a zapis upisa Husan ne da pokažu da bjeh već da me višlje neima. Ljeta Gospodnjeg 1258." ("My stone was carved by Dražeta and inscription was engraved by Husan, not to show that I existed, but that I do not exist any more. Anno Domini 1258.")

Hrisovulje of Dečani
Name Dražeta and name or surname Dražetin are mentioned in the "Hrisovulje of Dečani" ("Dečanske hrisovulje"), which are medieval Serbian documents written in the time when Dečani monastery was built, in the first half of the 14th century. These documents contain census that recorded inhabitants of the Dečani manor, and among the inhabitants, there were persons that had mentioned names. The "Hrisovulje of Dečani" were written around 1330/1331.

Name Dražeta is found in the "Second hrisovulja of Dečani", and it was recorded in the village Dobra Reka, which was located in the territory of present-day Andrijevica municipality in Montenegro.

This is the inscription:
"Dragoje Hlapović a brat mu Dražeta" ("Dragoje Hlapović and his brother Dražeta")

Name or surname Dražetin is found in the "Third hrisovulja of Dečani", and it was recorded in the village Vlasi Sremljane, which was located in the territory of present-day Đakovica municipality in Metohija.

This is the inscription:
"Bogoje i Dražetin" ("Bogoje and Dražetin")

According to "Srpski prezimenik" (Dr Velimir Mihajlović, Novi Sad, 2002), Dražetin was a surname in this case, while Milica Grković (Imena u Dečanskim hrisovuljama, Novi Sad, 1983) think that it was a name.

Montenegrin defters
The "Harač defter of Montenegro" (Ottoman tax record) from 1521 mention a person with name Dražeta Radivoj in the village Desići in Montenegro. The same person is also mentioned in "Imperial defter for Montenegro and nahije of Grbalj" from 1523, although with aslight difference: the person is mentioned as Dražeta Radonja and the village is mentioned as Lešnji Desići, but it is sure that it is the same village and the same person. However, it cannot be said for sure whether Dražeta is a given name or a surname of this person.

Katastig of Patriarchate of Peć
Name Dražeta is mentioned in the place Berčul in Banat, in 1660. It was recorded in the "Holly katastig of monasteries of the Holly and Great Church of the Patriarchate of Peć". "Katastig" is a list which contains records who donated what to the Patriarchate of Peć. When mandataries of the patriarch visited Berčul in 1660, this inscription was written:
"Pridoše k nam kmetovi Dražeta, Toma i Radoica i prinesoše ot sela milostinju 1.000 aspri. Paki Dražeta pisa sebe pros, dade 110 aspri; Toma pisa sebe pros, dade 83 aspre; Radoica pisa sebe pros, - osta, - reče vola. Radovan Ćurčija prinese lisicu na blagoslov. Blagoje pisa škopca, osta." (Prefects of the village Dražeta, Toma and Radoica came to us and gave us alms of the village - 1,000 aspri. Dražeta gave 110 aspri, Toma gave 83 aspri, and Radoica gave a bullock. Radovan Ćurčija bring us fox for blessing. Blagoje reported the emasculated one.")

We can see that one of the prefects of the village ("kmets") was named Dražeta, and, according to the size of the alms that he gave, we can assume that he was the wealthiest inhabitant of the village.

Notable people with this name or surname/surnames
 Dražeta, prior (supreme priest) of the Bosnian Church in the 13th century.
 Grgur Dražetić, prince that ruled over part of Dalmatia in the 15th century.
 Dr. Mladen Dražetin, doctor of social sciences, economist, university professor, theatrical creator, actor, poet and literate.
 Milivoj Dražetin (1952–1970), poet.
 Darko Dražeta, mayor of Ston municipality, Croatia.
 Lazar Dražeta, a biologist.
 Lucas Drazeta, a basketball player in Argentina.

Place names similar to this name/surname
 Dražetice, a place in the Czech Republic. A very interesting thing about this place is the fact that one of its neighbouring places is called Novy Knin ("New Knin"), which imply possible connection of these two places with northern Dalmatia since both names could be found in northern Dalmatia in similar forms (town of Knin and surname Dražeta).

Further reading 

Dr Velimir Mihajlović, Srpski prezimenik, Novi Sad, 2002
Milica Grković, Rečnik imena Banjskog, Dečanskog i Prizrenskog vlastelinstva u 14. veku, Beograd, 1986
Milica Grković, Imena u dečanskim hrisovuljama, Novi Sad, 1983
Gordana Vuković - Ljiljana Nedeljkov, Rečnik prezimena Šajkaške (18. i 19. vek), Novi Sad, 1983
Branislav Đurđev i Lamija Hadžiosmanović, Dva deftera Crne Gore iz vremena Skender-bega Crnojevića, druga sveska, Sarajevo, 1973
Milica Grković, Rečnik ličnih imena kod Srba, Beograd, 1977
Vuk Stefanović Karadžić, Srpski rječnik, u Beču, 1818
Vuk Stefanović Karadžić, Srpski rječnik, u Beču, 1852
Prof. dr Milan Bosanac, Prosvjetin imenoslov, Zagreb, 1984
Rječnik hrvatskoga ili srpskoga jezika, Jugoslavenska akademija znanosti i umjetnosti, u Zagrebu, 1884–1886
Stojan Novaković, Srpski pomenici 15-18. veka, u Beogradu, 1875
Milorad Babić - Petar Vukelić - Sretenije Zorkić, Hronika Starih Banovaca, Sremska Mitrovica, 1989
Dr Dušan J. Popović, Srbi u Vojvodini, knjiga druga, Novi Sad, 1990
Dušan J. Popović, Srbi u Sremu do 1736/7, Beograd, 1950
Sreta Pecinjački, Stari Banovci do kraja 18. veka, Matica Srpska, Zbornik za društvene nauke 36, Novi Sad, 1963
Leksik prezimena Socijalističke Republike Hrvatske, Zagreb, 1976
Đorđe Janjatović, Prezimena Srba u Bosni, Sombor, 1993
Dr Nikola Zvonimir Bjelovučić, Poluostrvo Rat (Pelješac), Naselja i poreklo stanovništva, knjiga 11, Beograd, 1922
Živko Bjelanović, Antroponimija Bukovice, Split, 1988
Pavle Ivić i Milica Grković, Dečanske hrisovulje, Novi Sad, 1976
Velibor Lazarević, Srpski imenoslov, Zemun - Novi Beograd, 2001
Đ. Daničić, Rječnik iz književnih starina srpskih, dio prvi, u Biogradu, 1863
Knez Medo Pucić, Spomenici srbski od 1395. do 1423., u Beogradu, 1858
Marko Vego, Zbornik srednjovjekovnih natpisa Bosne i Hercegovine, Sarajevo, 1964
Brankica Čigoja, Najstariji srpski ćirilski natpisi, Beograd, 1998
prof dr Milorad Pavić, Stari srpski zapisi i natpisi, Beograd, 1986
Prof. dr Vasa Čubrilović, Popis bogomilskih vladara, "Politika", February 21, 1965
Ljub. Stojanović, Stari srpski zapisi i natpisi, knjiga 1, Beograd, 1902
Nenad Azizin Tanović, Stećci ili oblici bosanskih duša, Sarajevo, 1994
Dimitrije Bogdanović, Kosovo u poveljama srpskih vladara, Banja Luka - Beograd, 2000
D. J. Popović i S. Matić, O Banatu i stanovništvu Banata u 17. veku, iz Glasnika istorijskog društva u Novom Sadu, sveska 9 i 10, Sremski Karlovci, Srpska manastirska štamparija, 1931 - 343
Radojica Jovićević, O imenima, Beograd, 1995.
Vjekoslav Klaić, Poviest Bosne, Sarajevo, 1990.
Dr Vladimir Ćorović, Historija Bosne, Beograd, 1940.
Dr Franjo Rački, Borba Južnih Slovena za državnu neodvisnost - bogomili i patareni, Beograd, 1931.
Augustino Theiner, Vetera monumenta Slavorum meridionalium, Romae, 1863.
Svetislav Davidović, Srpska pravoslavna crkva u Bosni i Hercegovini (od 960. do 1930. god.), Novi Sad, 1998.

Notes

Croatian surnames
Serbian masculine given names
Serbian surnames
Croatian masculine given names
Bosnian surnames
Bosnian masculine given names
Montenegrin surnames
Montenegrin masculine given names